Tamati Edward Ellison (born 1 April 1983) is a New Zealand rugby union footballer.

Career

Domestic
Ellison was born in Wellington, and made his debut for the Wellington Lions in the 2003 NPC final defeat against Auckland. He also captained the Lions during the 2007 Air New Zealand Cup, leading them to the final where they were once again defeated by Auckland. He was named as Wellington's Player of the Year for 2007.

He made his Super Rugby debut in 2005 for the Blues after being called into their squad as an injury replacement and appearing as a substitute in their final match of the season against the New South Wales Waratahs. He made his Hurricanes debut in 2006 and went on to make 10 appearances that season, all coming from the bench. His run-on debut came against the Chiefs in 2007. He made his 50th Super Rugby appearance during the 2010 season.

In March 2010, he confirmed he had activated a get-out clause in his NZRU contract to sign a three-year deal to play for the Ricoh Black Rams in the Top League. His agent reported that the deal was made in order to secure the financial future of Ellison's family.

In 2011, it was confirmed that Ellison had signed with the Highlanders for the 2012 and 2013 seasons. In March 2013, it was announced that he had resigned for the Ricoh Black rams for the 2013–14 Top League season.

In September 2013, it was announced that Ellison had signed with the Rebels for the 2014 season, reuniting with former teammates Telusa Veainu and Scott Fuglistaller.

International
Ellison captained the Junior All Blacks to victory in the 2009 Pacific Nations Cup, a year after winning the 2008 edition as co-captain of the New Zealand Maori, alongside Liam Messam.

He was chosen as one of four new caps for the All Blacks 2009 end of year tour to Europe and made his first test appearance in the 20–6 victory against Italy in Milan.

As well as the All Blacks, Junior All Blacks and the New Zealand Maori, he played for the New Zealand Sevens, and represented New Zealand at U-21 and U-19 levels. He was part of the New Zealand Sevens team that won a gold medal at the 2006 Commonwealth Games in Melbourne.

Personal life

Family
He is the grandson of All Black Vince Bevan, who played six tests for New Zealand between 1949–50, and son of rugby coach Eddie Ellison. He is the older brother of Jacob Ellison, who plays  for the Fukuoka Sanix Blues. He is related to former American Football player Riki Ellison who played in the NFL for the San Francisco 49ers and the Los Angeles Raiders and to current NFL player Rhett Ellison who plays for the New York Giants. He is also a descendant of Thomas Ellison, captain of New Zealand's first official rugby team in 1893 and a member of the New Zealand Natives football team which toured Great Britain and Australia in 1888–89.

Marriage
In June 2011 he married Meremaraea Cowan at a vineyard in Martinborough. He first saw a picture of Meremaraea when he was a teenager at the home of his rugby coach, who also happened to be her uncle. Instead of wedding gifts they requested that guests donate to the Red Cross appeals for the Christchurch earthquake and the disaster in Japan. They have three children.

Super Rugby statistics

References

External links
 
 

Living people
New Zealand international rugby union players
1983 births
New Zealand rugby union players
Melbourne Rebels players
Commonwealth Games gold medallists for New Zealand
Rugby union players from Wellington City
Ngāi Tahu people
Māori All Blacks players
Rugby sevens players at the 2006 Commonwealth Games
New Zealand male rugby sevens players
Hurricanes (rugby union) players
Highlanders (rugby union) players
Otago rugby union players
Wellington rugby union players
Blues (Super Rugby) players
Expatriate rugby union players in Japan
Expatriate rugby union players in Australia
New Zealand expatriate sportspeople in Japan
New Zealand expatriate sportspeople in Australia
Black Rams Tokyo players
People educated at Mana College
New Zealand international rugby sevens players
Commonwealth Games rugby sevens players of New Zealand
Commonwealth Games medallists in rugby sevens
Ellison family
Kurita Water Gush Akishima players
Rugby union centres
Medallists at the 2006 Commonwealth Games